Anshuman Gautam (born 17 June 1994) is an Indian cricketer. He made his List A debut for Bihar in the 2018–19 Vijay Hazare Trophy on 26 September 2018. He made his first-class debut for Bihar in the 2018–19 Ranji Trophy on 30 December 2018. He made his Twenty20 debut on 8 November 2019, for Bihar in the 2019–20 Syed Mushtaq Ali Trophy.

References

External links
 

1994 births
Living people
Indian cricketers
Bihar cricketers
Place of birth missing (living people)